Used may refer to:

Common meanings
Used good, goods of any type that have been used before or pre-owned
Used to, English auxiliary verb

Places
Used, Huesca, a village in Huesca, Aragon, Spain
Used, Zaragoza, a town in Zaragoza, Aragon, Spain

Music
"Used" (song), a song by Rocket from the Crypt from their 1995 album Scream, Dracula, Scream!
The Used, a rock band from Orem, Utah
The Used (album), their 2002 debut album
"Used", a song by SZA from her 2022 album SOS

See also
Use (disambiguation)